Southwest Covenant School is a Christian private school in Yukon, Oklahoma, United States, with approximately 300 students enrolled in Kindergarten through 12th grade.  The school was established in 1982 and is accredited by Christian Schools International (CSI).

School history
Southwest Covenant Schools was founded in 1982 as a non-denominational Christian school, originally offering instruction to children in pre-school through sixth grade. In 1984 SWCS expanded through the eighth grade. In 1991, the school added grades 9–12, with the first senior class graduating in 1996. SWCS moved into a new secondary facility 1996. Until then the school conducted classes for grades six through twelve at Trinity Baptist Church in Yukon and Putnam City Baptist Church in Warr Acres, until they built their own facility in the fall of 1996. In 2014 a ground-breaking was held for the new elementary building.

Education
The school's educational philosophy is based on the centrality of all truth coming from God and His Son, Jesus Christ, as revealed in the Bible.  Southwest Covenant School's aim is to teach and instill a Biblical world view in the students, while also providing them with the knowledge needed to succeed in life

The average cumulative ACT scores for all SWCS graduates is 25.92. The great majority of SWCS graduates have attended or are currently attending institutions of higher learning.

Athletics
Southwest Covenant currently participates in sports including football, basketball, baseball, volleyball, track and field, and golf.

Notable alumni
 Dan Bailey, current 2nd most accurate all-time NFL kicker

References

External links
 

Schools in Canadian County, Oklahoma
Educational institutions established in 1982
Private high schools in Oklahoma
Private middle schools in Oklahoma
Private elementary schools in Oklahoma
1982 establishments in Oklahoma